Fontenelle Abbey or the Abbey of St. Wandrille is a Benedictine monastery in the commune of Rives-en-Seine. It was founded in 649 near Caudebec-en-Caux in Seine-Maritime, Normandy, France.

First foundation
It was founded by Wandregisel or Saint Wandrille (d. 22 July 668) and his nephew Godo, on land obtained through the influence of Wandregisel's friend Saint Ouen, Archbishop of Rouen. Wandrille, being of the royal family of Austrasia, held a high position in the court of his kinsman Dagobert I, but wishing to devote his life to God, he retired to the abbey of Montfaucon-d'Argonne, in Champagne, in 629. Later he went to Bobbio Abbey and then to Romainmôtier Abbey, where he remained for ten years. In 648 he returned to Normandy and established the monastery of Fontenelle, using the Rule of Saint Columbanus, which he had known at Bobbio; the deed of gift of the land is dated 1 March 649. It was one of the first Benedictine abbeys in Normandy and part of a powerful network of Carolingian monasteries spread across Normandy.

(This church was destroyed by fire in 756 and rebuilt by Abbot Ansegisus (823–33), who added a narthex and tower).

The monastery acquired extensive property and was extremely successful at first. In 740 however there began a series of lay abbots, under whom the monastery declined. In 823 Ansegisus, nephew of Abbot Gervold, was appointed abbot of Fontenelle, which he reformed according to the practice at Luxeuil Abbey.

The abbey soon became a target for Viking raids, culminating in that of 9 January 852 when it was burnt down and the monks fled with the relics of Saint Wandrille. After more than a century in temporary accommodation at Chartres, Boulogne, Saint-Omer and Ghent, the community was at length brought back to Fontenelle by Abbot Maynard in 966 and a restoration of the buildings was again undertaken. Richard I of Normandy then sent Maynard to establish the Benedictine Rule at Mont-Saint-Michel Abbey.

A new church was built by Abbot Gérard, but was hardly finished when it was destroyed by lightning in 1012. Undaunted by this disaster the monks once more set to work and another church was consecrated in 1033. Two centuries later, in 1250, this was burnt to the ground, but Abbot Pierre Mauviel at once began a new one. The work was hampered by lack of funds and it was not until 1331 that the building was finished.

Monks and arts

Meanwhile, the monastery attained a position of great importance and celebrity for the fervour and learning of its monks, who during the periods of its greatest prosperity numbered over 300. It was especially noted for its library and school, where letters, the fine arts, the sciences, and above all calligraphy, were cultivated.

One of the most notable of its early copyists was Saint Harduin (Haduin), a celebrated mathematician (died 811) who wrote with his own hand four copies of the Gospels, one of Saint Paul's Epistles, a psalter, three sacramentaries, and many other volumes of homilies and lives of the saints, besides numerous mathematical works. The Capitularia regum Francorum, a collection of royal capitularies, was compiled under Abbot Ansegisus in the 9th century, who also commissioned a chronicle of the abbey, the Gesta abbatum Fontanellensium. The monks of Fontenelle enjoyed many rights and privileges, among which were exemption from all river-tolls on the Seine, and the right to exact taxes in the town of Caudebec. The charter dated 1319 in which were enumerated their chief privileges, was confirmed by Henry V of England and Normandy in 1420, and by the Council of Basle in 1436.

Some of the burials at the abbey are
Saint Condedus (Conde), a 7th-century exile from England who became a monk
Saint Wando, Abbot, died around 756 AD
Saint Fulk of Fontenelle, 21st Abbot of Fontenelle
Saint Harduin of Fontenelle, died c. 811 AD
Saint Bagnus (Bagne), a monk, then Bishop of Therouanne, then Abbot of Fontenelle later in life. Died c. 710
Saint Girald, a monk and then the Abbot of Saint Arnoul. He was asked by the Duke of Normandy to be the Abbot of Fontenelle. He was very exacting and was later murdered by one of his monks
Dom Joseph Pothier, Abbot of St Wandrille Abbey and scholar who reconstituted the Gregorian chant.

Decline and suppression
Commendatory abbots were introduced at Fontenelle in the 16th century and as a result the prosperity of the abbey began to decline. In 1631 the central tower of the church suddenly fell, ruining all the adjacent parts, but fortunately without injuring the beautiful cloisters or the conventual buildings.

It was just at this time that the newly formed Congregation of Saint Maur was reviving the monasticism of France, and the commendatory abbot Ferdinand de Neufville invited them to take over the abbey and do for it what he himself was unable to accomplish. They accepted the offer, and in 1636 began major building works. Not only did they restore the damaged portion of the church, but they added new wings and gateways and also built a great chapter-hall for the meetings of the general chapter of the Maurist congregation. They gave the abbey new life, which lasted for the next hundred and fifty years.

During the French Revolution in 1791 Fontenelle was suppressed, and in the following year the property was sold by auction. The church was partially demolished, but the rest of the buildings served for some time as a factory and later passed into the possession of the de Stacpoole family, to be turned to domestic uses.

Second foundation
George Stanislaus, 3rd Duke de Stacpoole, who had become a priest and a domestic prelate of the pope, and who lived at Fontenelle until his death in 1896, restored the entire property to the French Benedictines (Solesmes Congregation), and a colony of monks from Ligugé Abbey settled there in 1893, under Joseph Pothier as superior. Dom Pothier, a scholar who reconstituted the Gregorian chant and one of the most well-known Benedictines of the world, later was elected abbot of Saint Wandrille, becoming upon his installation on 24 July 1898 its first abbot since the French Revolution and its first regular abbot since the 16th century.

This community was expelled under the "Association Laws" by the French government in 1901, and spent years in Belgium until they were able to return on 26 January 1931, where they have remained until the present.

From 1907 until 1914, the abbey was rented by the Belgian writer Maurice Maeterlinck, who lived there during the warmer months of the year with his lover, Georgette Leblanc. During the official visit of the British royal family to France, Queen Mary visited the monastery on 12 July 1917.

Buildings

Besides the chief basilica Saint Wandrille built seven other churches or oratories both inside and outside the monastic enclosure. All of these have either perished in the course of time, or been replaced by others of later date, except for the chapel of St Saturnin, which stands on the hillside overlooking the abbey. It is one of the most ancient ecclesiastical buildings now existing and, though restored from time to time, is still substantially the original construction of Saint Wandrille. It is cruciform, with a central tower and eastern apse, and is a unique example of a 7th-century chapel.

In 1954, in the course of a treasure hunt, some young local scouts discovered three buried urns near at wall close to the chapel. The urns contained a total of about 500 gold coins, the latest dated 1748. The treasure was split between the abbey, as the property owner, and the parents of the boys. The abbey sold it share and used the proceeds to rebuild the outbuildings that had burned downed shortly after.

The parish church of the village of Saint-Wandrille-Rançon also dates from the saint's time, but it has been so altered and restored that little of the original structure remains.

The buildings were damaged by bombing in 1944. A new abbey church was consecrated on 12 September 1970.

Monks
Fontenelle has produced an unusually large number of saints and the blessed. The calendar of the present monastery records thirty, from the founders Saints Wandrille and Gond to Blessed Louis Lebrun, martyred in 1794 during the Revolution. All have their own feast days, but 1 March (also the date of the foundation) is the feast of all the saints of Fontenelle.

The present abbot, Dom Nault (succeeding to Dom Pierre Massein in 2009), is the 82nd in line from Saint Wandrille to hold the position.

List of abbots and priors

Abbots 
 Saint Wandrille, 649-668
 Lambert of Lyon, 668–678, later bishop of Lyon
 Ansbert of Rouen, 678–690, bishop of Rouen
 Saint Hildebert I, 694-701
 Saint Bain, 701-710
 Saint Bénigne, 710–716, and 719-724
 Saint Wandon, 716–719, and 747-754
 Hugh of Champagne, 719-723
 Saint Landon, 732-735
 Teutsind, abbot of Fontenelle and Saint Martin, Tours, 735–741.
 Wido, lay abbot, also abbot of Saint-Vaast, 742-744
 Rainfroy, 744–748, archbishop of Rouen
 Blessed Austrulfus, 748-753
 Witlaïc, 753-787
 Saint Gervold, previously bishop of Évreux, 787-806
 Trasaire, 806-817
 Hildebert II, 817-818
 Einhard, lay abbot, 818-823
 Saint Ansegisus, 823-833
 Joseph I, 833–834, again in 841
 Saint Foulques, 834-841
 Herimbert, 841-850
 Louis (abbot of Saint-Denis) (d. 9 January 867; relative and arch-chancellor of Charles the Bald), 850-867
 vacant, 867-886
 Ebles, 886-892
 Womar, 950-960
 Maynard, who left Saint Wandrille to become the first abbot of Mont-Saint-Michel, 960-966
 ?
 Ensulbert or Enjoubert, c. 980-993
 ?
 Saint Gerard, 1006-1029
 Saint Gradulphe, 1029-1048
 Robert I, 1048-1063
 Saint Gerbert, 1063-1089
 Lanfranc, nephew of Lanfranc, archbishop of Canterbury, 1089-1091
 Gerard II (1091-1125)
 Alain (1125-1137)
 Saint Gautier (1137-1150)
 Roger (1150-1165)
 Anfroy (1165-1178)
 Gautier II (1178-1187)
 Geoffroy I (1187-1193)
 Robert II (1193-1194)
 Reginald (1194-1207)
 Robert III de Montivilliers (1207-1219)
 Guillaume I de Bray (1219-1235)
 Guillaume de Suille, elected in 1235
 Robert IV d'Hautonne, 1235-1244
 Pierre Mauviel, 1244-1254
 Geoffroy II de Nointot, 1254-1288
 Guillaume II de Norville, 1288-1304
 Guillaume III de La Douillé, 1304-1342
 Jean I de Saint-Léger, 1342-1344
 Richard de Chantemerle, 1344-1345
 Robert V Balbet, 1345-1362
 Geoffroy III Savary, 1362-1367
 Geoffroy IV de Hotot, 1367-1389
 Jean II de Rochois, 1389-1412
 Guillaume de Hotot, elected in 1410
 Jean III de Bouquetot, bishop of Bayeux, 1412-1418
 Jean Langret, beneficiary abbot, 1418-1419
 Nicolas Lovier, beneficiary abbot, 1419
 Guillaume IV Ferrechat, 1419-1430
 Jean IV de Bourbon, 1431-1444
 Jean de Brametot, 1444-1483
 Cardinal André d'Espinay, commendatory abbot, archbishop of Bordeaux, 1483-1500
 Urbain de Fiesque, papal appointee, 1483-1485
 Jean VI Mallet, elected in 1500, not confirmed
 Philip of Cleves, commendatory abbot, 1502-1505
 Jacques Hommet, last regular abbot, 1505-1523
 François Guillaume de Castelnau-Clermont-Lodève, papal appointee, rejected
 Claude de Poitiers, commendatory abbot, 1523-1546
 Michel Bayard, commendatory abbot, 1546-1565
 Gilles Duret, temporary governor, 1565-1567
 Pierre II Gourreau, commendatory abbot, 1567-1569
 Cardinal Charles de Bourbon, commendatory abbot, 1569-1578
 Gilles de Vaugirault, commendatory abbot, 1578-1585
 Nicolas de Neufville, commendatory abbot, 1585-1616
 Camille de Neufville de Villeroy, commendatory abbot, 1616-1622
 Ferdinand de Neufville de Villeroy, commendatory abbot, 1622-1690
 Balthazar-Henry de Fourcy, commendatory abbot, 1690-1754
 vacancy 1754–1755
 Cardinal Frédéric Jérôme de La Rochefoucauld, commendatory abbot, 1755-1757
 Louis-Sextius de Jarente de La Bruyère, commendatory abbot, 1757-1785
 Cardinal Étienne-Charles de Loménie de Brienne, commendatory abbot, 1785-1790

Restoration of 1894 
After the restoration of religious life in 1894, Dom Jean-Martial Besse and Dom François Chamard were named superiors, after which Dom Joseph Bourigaud, the abbot of Ligugé Abbey, was named apostolic administrator in 1895 until the nomination of an abbot in 1898.
 Dom Joseph Pothier, O.S.B., sub-prior of Solesmes Abbey, then prior of Ligugé, superior (1895-1898) and abbot of Saint-Wandrille 1898–1923 (the first abbot since the abbey was suppressed in the French Revolution and the first regular abbot since Jacques Hommet in the 16th century)
 Dom Jean-Louis Pierdait, O.S.B., claustral prior of Silos Abbey, coadjutor of Dom Pothier (1920-1923), abbot 1923–1942
 Dom Gabriel Gonthard, O.S.B., abbot 1943–1962
 Dom Ignace Dalle, O.S.B., abbot 1962–1969
 Dom Antoine Levasseur, O.S.B., abbot 1969–1996
 Dom Pierre III Massein, O.S.B., abbot 1996–2009
 Dom Jean-Charles Nault, O.S.B., abbot from 2009

Priors
 Genesius of Lyon, prior around 650, later almoner of Saint Bathilde, wife of Clovis II
 Guillaume Girard, prior of Jumièges Abbey, and administrator of Saint-Wandrille, 1636
 Philippe Codebret, sub-prior, 1636
 Paul de Riveri, 1636–1637
 Charles Fuscien de Lattre, 1637–1639
 Hervé Philibert Cotelle, 1639–1645
 Jacques Aicadre Picard, 1645–1651
 Guillaume Benoît Bonté, 1651–1652
 Jean Timothée Bourgeois, 1652–1656
 Jean Bernard Hamelin, 1656–1660
 Martin Bruno Valles, 1660–1663
 Jean Matthieu Jouault, 1663–1666
 Vincent Humery, 1666–1669
 René Anselme des Rousseaux, 1669–1670
 Edme du Monceau, sub-prior, 1669–1670
 Pierre Laurent Hunault, 1670–1674
 Pierre Boniface Le Tan, 1674–1675
 Claude Carrel, 1675–1678
 Marc Rivard, 1678–1684
 Pierre Noblet, 1684
 Gabriel Dudan, 1684–1687
 Guillaume Hue, 1687–1693
 Robert Deslandes, 1693
 Nicolas Sacquespée, 1693–1696
 Gabriel Pouget, 1696–1699
 Claude Hémin, 1699–1705
 Jean-Baptiste Jouault, 1705
 Jacques Joseph Le Paulmier, 1705–1711
 Pierre Chevillart, 1711–1714
 Martin Filland, 1714–1717
 Louis Clouet, 1717–1723
 François L'héritier, 1723–1729
 Jean Foulques, 1729–1733
 Louis Barbe, 1733-1739 and 1740–1745
 Pierre Eudes, 1739–1740
 Jean Lefebvre, 1745–1748
 Jacques Martin Le Sec, 1748–1752
 Jean-Baptiste Duval, 1752–1757
 François René Desmares, 1757–1761
 Nicolas Faverotte, 1761–1768
 Louis Valincourt, 1768-1769 and 1775–1778
 Noël Nicolas Bourdon, 1769–1775
 Philippe Nicolas Dupont, 1778–1781
 Jean François Daspres, 1781–1783
 Mathurin François Brissier, sub-prior, 1783
 Alexandre-Jean Ruault, 1783-1790
 Dom Joseph Pothier, 1895

See also

List of Carolingian monasteries
Carolingian architecture
Carolingian art

References

Sources
 Patrick Leigh Fermor (2007). A Time to Keep Silence. New York: NYRB.  (Originally published: London: Queen Anne Press, 1953).

External links
 
 Abbey website
 Dom Pothier biography in French

Benedictine monasteries in France
Carolingian architecture
Christian monasteries established in the 7th century
Buildings and structures in Seine-Maritime

Churches in Seine-Maritime
Burial sites of the House of Normandy
Churches completed in 649
7th-century churches in France